The Foley Baronetcy, of Thorpe Lee in the County of Surrey, was a title in the Baronetage of Great Britain. It was created on 1 July 1767 for Robert Ralph Foley. He was a member of the influential family of ironmasters founded by Richard Foley, which also include the Barons Foley. The title became extinct on his death in 1782.

Foley baronets, of Thorpe Lee (1767)
Sir Robert Ralph Foley, 1st Baron (–1782)

See also
Baron Foley

References

Extinct baronetcies in the Baronetage of Great Britain
1767 establishments in Great Britain